Bulbophyllum membranaceum is a species of orchid in the genus Bulbophyllum. It produces small maroon coloured flowers about six mm long. The pseudobulbs are rounded and each carries a single leaf. It is native to Papua New Guinea, Fiji, Samoa, Borneo, Sumatra, and other countries in the South East Asia region.

References
The Bulbophyllum-Checklist
The Internet Orchid Species Photo Encyclopedia

External links
B. membranaceum photo at Orchids Online (Australia)

membranaceum